Hornet was an 1851 extreme clipper in the San Francisco trade, famous for its race with Flying Cloud.

Race with Flying Cloud
Hornet had a two-day head start on Flying Cloud in their famous 1853 race. She left New York City for San Francisco, California on April 26, 1853, with Flying Cloud departing two days later.

After the roughly 15,000-nautical mile (27,780-km) voyage around Cape Horn, both ships arrived in San Francisco harbor 106 days later at almost the same time, with Hornet sailing in just 45 minutes ahead of Flying Cloud.

Loss
In 1866, Hornet left New York City bound for San Francisco under Captain Josiah A. Mitchell with a cargo of candles, case oil, and oil in barrels. During the voyage, she caught fire and sank in the Pacific Ocean on May 3, 1866. The crew left the ship in three open lifeboats. The captain′s boat reached Hawaii after 43 days at sea on June 15, 1866, with 14 survivors aboard, but the two other boats disappeared.  Mark Twain, on the islands as a special correspondent from the Sacramento Daily Union, interviewed several of the survivors and filed the first extensive report.

Images
Hornet clipper ship card

References

Further reading 

 

 

California clippers
Individual sailing vessels
Ships built by Westervelt & MacKay
1851 ships
Maritime incidents in May 1866
Ship fires
Shipwrecks in the Pacific Ocean